Twice Shy may refer to:
Twice Shy, a 1981 novel by Dick Francis
 an official text adventure game based on the novel
"Twice Shy" (Farscape episode), a 2003 episode in Season 4 of Farscape
...Twice Shy, a 1989 album by Great White